Pescadería is a town in the Barahona province of the Dominican Republic.

Sources 

Populated places in Barahona Province